Jean Bruce Scott  (born February 25, 1956) is a retired American actress, best known for her role as former Texas Highway Patrol helicopter pilot Caitlin O'Shannessy in the 1984-1987 CBS action thriller television series Airwolf. She had a recurring role as Lieutenant, later Lieutenant Commander, Maggie Poole in seasons 3-8 of Magnum, P.I..

In 2007, she worked as the executive director and producer of Native Voices at the Autry, a program devoted to developing and producing new works for the stage by Native American playwrights, and is affiliated with the Autry National Center.

Education
The Monterey, California-born Scott attended La Quinta High School (Westminster, California; 1970–74) and California State University, Fullerton (1975-79). She later attended UCLA in the late 1980s, and graduated from California State University, Northridge in 1992.

Filmography

Television

References

External links
 

1956 births
20th-century American actresses
21st-century American actresses
Living people
American television actresses
American soap opera actresses
Actresses from California
California State University, Northridge alumni
People from Monterey, California